Kutumba Rao or Kutumbarao (Telugu: కుటుంబరావు) is an Indian name.

 Kodavatiganti Kutumba Rao, prolific Indian writer
 Turlapaty Kutumba Rao, Indian writer

Indian given names